Syed Ejaz Hussain Bukhari is a Pakistani politician who was a Member of the Provincial Assembly of the Punjab, from 2002 to 2007 and again from May 2013 to May 2018.

Early life and education
He was born on the 5th of March 1941 in Attock.

He has a degree of Master of Arts which he obtained in 1966 and a degree of Bachelor of Law which he received in 1967 from University of Karachi.

Political career

He was elected to the Provincial Assembly of the Punjab as a candidate of Muttahida Majlis-e-Amal from Constituency PP-15 (Attock-I) in 2002 Pakistani general election. He received 23,775 votes and defeated a candidate of Pakistan Muslim League (Q) (PML-Q).

He ran for the seat of the Provincial Assembly of the Punjab as a candidate of PML-Q from Constituency PP-15 (Attock-I) in 2008 Pakistani general election but was unsuccessful. He received 24,808 votes and lost the seat to a candidate of Pakistan Peoples Party.

He was re-elected to the Provincial Assembly of the Punjab as a candidate of Pakistan Tehreek-e-Insaf from Constituency PP-15 (Attock-I) in 2013 Pakistani general election.

References

Living people
Punjab MPAs 2013–2018
Punjab MPAs 2002–2007
1941 births
Pakistan Tehreek-e-Insaf politicians